The 2019–20 UNC Greensboro women's basketball team represents the University of North Carolina at Greensboro during the 2019–20 NCAA Division I women's basketball season. The Spartans, led by 5th-year head coach Trina Patterson, play their home games at Fleming Gymnasium. They are members of the Southern Conference (SoCon)

Previous season 

The Spartans finished the 2018-2019 season 11-19, 5-9 in conference play. They lost in the quarterfinals of the Southern Conference tournament to Chattanooga. Nadine Soliman was named to the All-Southern Conference first-team, and Te'ja Twitty was named to the All-Southern Conference second-team.

Roster

Schedule and results

|-
!colspan=12 style=|Non-conference regular season

|-
!colspan=12 style=|SoCon regular season

|-
!colspan=9 style=| SoCon Tournament

UNC Greensboro
UNC Greensboro Spartans basketball